was a Korean-Japanese playwright, theater director, and screenwriter. He was one of Japan's most influential theater figures, to the extent that recent Japanese theatrical history has been divided into pre-Tsuka and post-Tsuka periods.

He died of lung cancer in Kamogawa, Chiba Prefecture at age 62.

Early life 
Tsuka was a second-generation Korean-Japanese whose experience as a member of a minority informed his work. His pen name is derived from "itsuka kohei", meaning "equal someday." Tsuka started his theater career with "A Red Beret for You" as a student at Keio University.

Career 
In 1974, Tsuka started his own group, Tsuka Kōhei Jimusho, a part of the second generation of modern Japanese theater. He focused less on text, often improvising based on the written play, and used the everyday language of the youth. The sets of his plays were minimal, with the stage almost empty. His system, called jikogekika, compels actors to put themselves and their ideas on stage, with little concern for society as a whole.

Tsuka took a break from the stage from November 1982 to February 1989.

Selected works 
1970 Yūbinya-san chotto1971 Sensō de shinenakatta otōsan no tame ni1972 Shokyū kakumei kōza hiryūden1973 Atami satsujin jiken (The Atami Murder Case)1980 Sutorippā monogatari1981 Kamata kōshinkyoku1982 Bara Hoteru1982 Tsuka-ban Chūshingura1983 Seishun kakeochiban1987 Kyōko

Awards 

 Kunio Kishida Drama Prize for "The Atami Murder Case" (1974)
 86th Naoki Literary Prize for the film Fall Guy (1981)
Japan Academy Prize for Screenplay of the Year for the film Fall Guy (1983)

References 

Japanese screenwriters
Japanese theatre directors
Japanese dramatists and playwrights
1948 births
2010 deaths
People from Kamogawa, Chiba
People from Kama, Fukuoka